Al-Taman'ah Subdistrict  is a Syrian nahiyah (subdistrict) located in Ma'arrat al-Nu'man District in Idlib.  According to the Syria Central Bureau of Statistics (CBS), Al-Taman'ah Subdistrict had a population of 29,114 in the 2004 census.

References 

Subdistricts of Idlib Governorate